Vagonul Arad was a football club based in Arad, Romania. It was founded in 1911 and it soon became one of the best teams from Arad. It was affiliated to Astra Arad rail equipment manufacturing company. It was dissolved in 2006.

History

1911–1948 

The club was formed in Arad in 1911 when AMEF (Asociația Muncitorilor pentru Educație Fizică) (Workers Association for Physical Education) merged with Clubul Sportiv Al Fabricii De Vagoane (Rail Cars Factory Sports Club), keeping the first ones name until 1948.

After World War I it qualified for the national championship 3 times, but never being able to pass the semi-finals.

During 1932-1940 we see the club playing in Liga I, their best performance - 2nd place at the end of the 1935-36 season.

In 1940 AMEF is dissolved by the legionar regime, but after World War II, we see it for a couple of years in Liga II (1946–1948).

1948–1962 

In 1948 it merges with Astra Arad, the new club being named UVA-AMEFA, and plays for one season in Liga III, after which until 1955 it plays in the regional championship. Being renamed Metalul, plays for one year in Liga II (1955–1956) and for one year in Liga III (1956–1957). With a new name Energia, plays  for one year in Liga II (1957–1958). In 1958 the club comes back to its traditional name AMEF Arad, and plays in the Liga II until 1962.

1962–1989 

Once again the club is renamed, this time to Vagonul, after its main sponsor Întreprinderea de Vagoane Arad (Arad Rail Cars Enterprise). Under this name it plays in Liga II in the 1962–1963 season, in Liga III in the 1963–1964 season, and again in Liga II until 1968, at the end of which, the club succeeds to promote to Liga I. In the same year, the team reaches the semi-finals of the Romanian Cup. After only one season of top class football, the team relegates to Liga II and from now forward we see it going only down. 1969–1971 Liga II, after this Liga III, where they were close to the regional championship, but in 1973 a merger with CFR Arad saved them. The new team was given the name Unirea, and plays in Liga II until 1977, in 1974 changing its name again, this time to Rapid Arad. The 1977–1980 period sees the club in Liga III, 1980–1984 in Liga II, 1984–1989 Liga III. In 1985 – CSM Rapid, 1986 – Vagonul, 1987 – CSM Vagonul.

1989–2006 

The club succeeds to promote to Liga II once again in 1989, from 1991 with the name of Astra. The spell lasts only until 1992, and the club sees itself in Liga III once again. The name changes again: FC Arad in 1994, Telecom Arad in 1996, and Romtelecom in 2005.

At the end of the Liga III 2005-06 season, the club finished 13th and relegated to the Arad County Championship (Fourth League), and with this we see the disappearance of another old Romanian football club.

Chronology of names

Honours

Liga I:
Winners (0):
Runners-up (1): 1935–36

Liga II:
Winners (1): 1967–68
Runners-up (1): 1946–47

Liga III:
Winners (5): 1956, 1963–64, 1971–72, 1979–80, 1988–89
Runners-up (3): 1986–87, 1987–88, 2000–01

References

External links
 Vagonul Arad's profile on romaniansoccer.ro

Association football clubs established in 1911
Association football clubs disestablished in 2006
Defunct football clubs in Romania
Football clubs in Arad County
Liga I clubs
Arad, Romania
1911 establishments in Austria-Hungary
2006 disestablishments in Romania
Works association football clubs in Romania